Mictocommosis nigromaculata is a species of moth of the family Tortricidae. It is found in Japan (including Honshu), as well as Vietnam.

The wingspan is 13–15 mm.

References

Moths described in 1930
Mictocommosis
Moths of Japan